Balestrand (locally called Holmen) is a village in Sogndal Municipality in Vestland county, Norway. The village is located on the northern shore of the Sognefjorden, at the mouth of the small Esefjorden. The local Tjugum Church is located there, serving the people of the village of Balestrand.

The village was the administrative centre of the old Balestrand Municipality until 2020.  It is also a major tourist stop since the 1800s with several hotels including the Kviknes Hotel.  The Sognefjord Aquarium and The Norwegian Museum of Travel and Tourism are located in the village.  There are ferry routes each summer from Balestrand to the Fjærlandsfjorden and to the village of Flåm.  There is also fast boat service from Balestrand to the city of Bergen.  Balholm AS, a fruit juice processing company is based in Balestrand.

Name
The compounded name Balestrand was created by the Norwegian writer Henrik Wergeland as he traveled in Sogn in 1832 and wrote the poem "Framnæs-Balestrand". The first element is the name of the old farm Bale and the last element is "strand" which means "beach".  The name of the farm is identical with the word bali which means "hillside along a beach".  Historically, the village area was also known as Balholm or simply Holmen.

Media gallery

References

Villages in Vestland
Sogndal